Kali Prasad Mukherjee (born 20 November 1966) is an Indian  film and television actor who is best known for playing supporting roles in Bollywood films and Indian soap operas.

Filmography

Television

References

External links
 

Living people
Indian male television actors
Male actors from Mumbai
Male actors in Hindi cinema
21st-century Indian male actors
Indian male film actors
Male actors in Hindi television
Actors from Mumbai
1966 births